The Gran Hotel Guadalpin Banús is a luxury five-star hotel in Puerto Banús, Marbella, Spain. The hotel is situated on the beach and contains 181 rooms. The hotel is served by the Lorea restaurant specializing in Basque cuisine, and the bars Sofia Cócteles and Pool Bar.

See also
List of hotels in Spain

References

External links
Official site

Hotels in Marbella
Hotels established in 2004
Hotel buildings completed in 2004
Hotels in Spain